Haškovy povídky ze starého mocnářství is a 1952 Czechoslovak comedy film directed by Oldřich Lipský. The film starred Josef Kemr.

References

External links
 

1952 films
1950s Czech-language films
Films based on works by Jaroslav Hašek
Films directed by Oldřich Lipský
Czechoslovak comedy films
1952 comedy films
Czechoslovak black-and-white films
1950s Czech films